Derek Archer (born 25 October 1960) is a Trinidad and Tobago sprinter. He competed in the men's 4 × 400 metres relay at the 1984 Summer Olympics.

References

External links

1960 births
Living people
Athletes (track and field) at the 1984 Summer Olympics
Trinidad and Tobago male sprinters
Olympic athletes of Trinidad and Tobago
Place of birth missing (living people)